Elachista griseella is a moth of the family Elachistidae. It is found from France to Italy and Ukraine.

The larvae feed on Calamagrostis epigejos, Dactylis glomerata, Elymus repens, Festuca rubra and Poa pratensis. They mine the leaves of their host plant. The secondary mines are elongate blotches that usually descend from near the leaf tip. The frass is deposited in a diffuse elongated stripe. Pupation takes place outside of the mine. They are dull yellowish green with a light brown head. The species hibernates as an intermediate larva and resumes feeding in early April.

References

griseella
Moths described in 1843
Moths of Europe